Thomas Hearns vs. Michael Olajide, billed as The Barrage at Trump Taj, was a professional boxing match contested on April 28, 1990 for the  WBO super middleweight title.

Background
Following a controversial draw in his previous fight, it was announced that Thomas Hearns would make his second defense of the WBO super middleweight title against Michael Olajide. The bout was set to be the first to be held at the then-newly opened Trump Taj Mahal owned by Donald Trump. Trump was in the midst of his high-profile separation (and eventual divorce) from wife Ivana which overshadowed the pre-fight press conferences.

Olajide had been a top prospect in the middleweight division, becoming the #2 middleweight contender in 1987 and securing a title shot for the vacant IBF middleweight against the #1 ranked Hearns, but Hearns turned down the fight in order to move up to the light heavyweight division. With Hearns leaving the middleweight division, Olajide ascended to the #1 middleweight, but lopsided losses to Frank Tate and Iran Barkley had hurt his status as one of the premier up-and-comers. In an effort to resurrect his career, Olajide had parted ways with this father, Michael Olajide, Sr. in favor of legendary trainer Angelo Dundee prior to landing the Hearns fight.

The fight
Hearns cruised to a relatively easy unanimous decision victory. Hearns served as the aggressor for the entire duration of the fight as Olajide took a more defensive approach and offered little offensively in the fight. Hearns would score the fight's lone knockdown after dropping Olajide with a right cross. Olajide would answer the referee's 10-count at 7 and withstood a flurry of punches while against the ropes as Hearns looked to finish the fight. The fight would ultimately go to the judge's scorecards with Hearns winning by large margins on all three; 120–107, 119–107 and 119–110.

Fight card

References

1990 in boxing
Boxing matches
1990 in sports in New Jersey
Boxing matches in Atlantic City, New Jersey
April 1990 sports events in the United States